Jacobaea erucifolia, the hoary ragwort (synonym Senecio erucifolius), is a species of the genus Jacobaea and the family Asteraceae.

References

External links

erucifolia